Vladimír Pucholt (born 30 December 1942) is a Czech-Canadian actor and physician.

Life 
Vladimír Pucholt was born in Prague, in the Protectorate of Bohemia and Moravia (present-day Czech Republic). His father was a lawyer. He was not allowed to study medicine so he became an actor. After acting in supporting roles in a few films he gained fame as Čenda in Miloš Forman's Black Peter. His next films, Starci na chmelu and Loves of a Blonde, turned him to one of the most famous young actors in Czechoslovakia. At the height of his popularity he decided to emigrate to the United Kingdom to study medicine.  He was admitted to study at the University of Sheffield thanks to a recommendation letter by the film director Lindsay Anderson. The writer John Le Carré lent him money for tuition. He graduated with a degree in medicine from Sheffield in 1974. In 1981 he moved to Canada where he worked as a paediatrician until his retirement.

Selected filmography 
 Kdyby ty muziky nebyly (1963)
 Black Peter (1963)
 Starci na chmelu (1964)
 První den mého syna (1964)
 Diamonds of the Night (1964) – voice
 Loves of a Blonde (1965)
 Svatba jako řemen (1965)
 Malatesta (1970)
 Návrat ztraceného ráje (1999)

References

External links

1942 births
Living people
Male actors from Prague
Czech male film actors
Czechoslovak film actors
20th-century Czech actors
Czech emigrants to Canada
Czech pediatricians
Canadian pediatricians
20th-century Canadian physicians
21st-century Canadian physicians